La Consulaire is the name of a very large Algerian Barbary artillery piece which famously defended Algiers harbour. It was looted by the French during the Invasion of Algiers in 1830, on 5 July, and taken as a trophy to Brest, where it is still displayed.

La Consulaire is a 23
-feet long smoothed-bore muzzle-loading gun, ordered by Hasan Pasha (son of Barbarossa) for the completion of the fortifications of Algiers. It was founded in Algiers in 1542 by a Venetian founder for Hasan Agha. Its original name is Baba Marzug ("lucky father").

The gun was used in 1683 to project the limbs of the consul of France, Jean Le Vacher, towards the fleet of Admiral Duquesne, earning it its name.

In 1830, a fleet under Admiral Duperré conquered Algiers and captured the gun. It was brought back to Brest and mounted on a granite stand decorated with high reliefs, and is on display inside the military zone of the Arsenal, near Recouvrance Bridge.

Gallery

Sources and references 

 Wikibrest

Individual cannons
History of Algiers
Military equipment of Algeria
Buildings and structures in Brest, France